Count Maurice de Patoul (1875-1965) was a Belgian Dignitary at the court.

Born as son of Léon de Patoul (1852-1926) and Countess Marie-Victorine d'Auxy de Launois (1851-1911). He was the Grand Marshall of king Albert of Belgium. Grace to Mgr. Clemente Micara, he was granted the Pontifical Equestrian Order of Saint Sylvester.

Honours 
 1930 : Created Count de Patoul, by Royal decree.
 Commander in the Order of Leopold.
 Knight Grand Cross in the Order of the Crown.
 1932 : Knight Grand Cross in the Pontifical Equestrian Order of Saint Sylvester Pope and Martyr
 Knight Grand Cross in the Order of the Oak Crown

References

Grand Crosses of the Order of the Crown (Belgium)
Belgian nobility
Belgian Roman Catholics